Barbara Bunkowsky-Scherbak (born October 13, 1958) is a Canadian professional golfer who played on the LPGA Tour. She also played under her maiden name, Barb Bunkowsky, and her married name, Barb Scherbak.

Bunkowsky played college golf at Florida State University and helped her team win the 1981 AIAW Championship. She was inducted into the FSU Hall of Fame in 1994.

Bunkowsky won once on the LPGA Tour in 1984.

Professional wins (1)

LPGA Tour wins (1)

Team appearances
Professional
Handa Cup (representing World team): 2006, 2007, 2008

References

External links

Canadian female golfers
Florida State Seminoles women's golfers
LPGA Tour golfers
Golfers from Toronto
Golfers from Tallahassee, Florida
Sportspeople from West Palm Beach, Florida
1958 births
Living people